A Summit Award is an international award for excellence in design, creativity and effectiveness of advertising and marketing communication. Presented 3 times annually by the Summit International Awards to creative studios and marketing agencies around the world.

Three times a year the Summit International Awards assembles an international panel of judges, from multiple creative disciplines to evaluate submissions in three main categories.

Summit Creative Award (Summit SCA)

Summit Marketing Effectiveness Award (Summit MEA)

Summit Emerging Media Awards (Summit EMA )

Entrants are graded on creativity, originality, effectiveness and excellence. From the entrants first round of judges will determine finalists, senior judges will then grade each finalist to determine if they are considered an award winner. An award winner can earn a Bronze, Silver or Gold Summit Award.  Only one winner in each category can be selected for a Summit Best of Show Award.

The award is open to professional creative arts agencies, studios and designers with annual billing less than $30 million in capitalized billings. from all countries.

References

External links
 Official website

Advertising awards